The Ilercavones were an ancient Iberian (Pre-Roman) people of the Iberian peninsula (the Roman Hispania). They are believed to have spoken an Iberian language.

History
The name Ilercavonia to refer to the territory occupied by this Iberian tribe appears in ancient Greek and Roman texts and documents and it was still mentioned in medieval texts. The northern limits of this territory were in Serra de la Llena, the northeastern in Coll de Balaguer, the western in Mequinensa and the southern in Sagunt.

The Ilercavones were very religious as a people. They did not have temples, but every mountain or hill was considered a sacred place. The Ilercavones as a nation or tribe were already mentioned by Pliny the Elder, who said that they inhabited the lands between river Udiva (possibly the Millars River) and further north of the Ebro, and by Ptolemy, who named the cape and the harbor where they lived Tenebri (possibly Orpesa). They were mentioned as well as by Livy in his texts describing the first phase of the Roman invasion of Iberia. 

After the Roman conquest the Ilercavones became romanized, much like the other Iberian tribes in the peninsula. Gradually, they became assimilated into the Roman population, especially after acquiring the Latin language as their own vernacular.

Archaeological sites
The most important archaeological sites are in the following places:
Castellet de Banyoles in Tivissa
Coll del Moro in Gandesa
Below the Castle of La Suda in Tortosa
Mianes in Tortosa
Below the Templar castle in Miravet
La Ferradura in Ulldecona
Moleta del Remei in Alcanar
Puig de la Nau in Benicarló
Sant Antoni Iberian village in Calaceite

See also
Ilercavonia
Iberians
Pre-Roman peoples of the Iberian Peninsula
Romanization (cultural)

References

External links

Detailed map of the Pre-Roman Peoples of Iberia (around 200 BC)
Nonasp Antiguo, The Ilercavones in Matarranya 
Els Ports - Archaeology

Pre-Roman peoples of the Iberian Peninsula
Ancient peoples of Spain
History of Catalonia
Tribes conquered by Rome